The Scimitar class was a class of three unarmed fast patrol boats operated by the British Royal Navy for the training purposes in the 1970s. They were built by Vosper Thornycroft in 1969 to 1971 and were withdrawn from use in 1981.

Design
While the Royal Navy abandoned the idea of large scale coastal forces in 1957, it maintained a small force of three boats, the Coastal Forces Trials and Special Service Squadron, to maintain proficiency in operations of fast patrol boats if the need arose in the future, and to act as targets for training the fleet in tactics against hostile fast patrol boats. The force consisted of the only two s to be completed along with one  boat.

In January 1969, an order was placed with Vosper Thornycroft for three fast training boats to replace the Braves and remaining Dark-class boats in the training role. The design chosen was a smaller derivative of the Brave-class design.

The ships' hulls were of laminated wood construction. A transom flap was fitted to the ship's stern to improve speed and trim at high speed. Complement was two officers and ten ratings.

The ships were unarmed, but were designed so that a gun or missile armament could be fitted if needed, while a third Proteus could be added for improved speed.

Service
The three boats were built at Vosper Thornycroft's Portchester yard from 1969 to 1971. Once initial teething problems associated with the settings for the transom flap were resolved, the boats met performance requirements. They served in the training role at Portland, with one boat (Scimitar) being sent to Hong Kong in 1979 for patrol duties, helping to intercept Vietnamese boat people and other migrants arriving by sea. The three boats were laid up ashore and put on the disposal list in 1981, and were later sold to Greek buyers.

Ships

References

Bibliography
 

 
 

Patrol vessels of the Royal Navy
Patrol boat classes
Ship classes of the Royal Navy